The Bruce by-election of 1920 was a by-election held on 14 April 1920 during the 20th New Zealand Parliament in the rural lower South Island electorate of the .

Background
The contest was triggered due to the resignation from Parliament of James Allen, who took up the position of New Zealand's High Commissioner to the United Kingdom. The Liberal Party's chosen candidate was John Edie. He had contested the Bruce electorate in the 1919 election against James Allen and was beaten by the mere margin of 126 votes (only 2.15%).

Results
The following table gives the election results:

Aftermath
The Bruce electorate was abolished for the 1922 general election. Edie won the Clutha electorate, holding it until 1925.

Notes

References

Bruce 1920
Bruce
Politics of Otago